Jorge León Schidlowsky Gaete (21 July 1931 – 10 October 2022) was a Chilean-Israeli composer and painter. He wrote music for orchestra, chamber ensemble, choir, and instruments including the piano, violin, cello, flute, mandolin, guitar, harp, organ. About 65 pieces were written in graphic notation. His compositions have been performed in numerous countries, with orchestra conductors including Aldo Ceccato, Clytus Gottwald, Erhard Karkoschka, Herbert Kegel, Lukas Foss, Zubin Mehta and Hermann Scherchen. The scores of his graphic music have been shown in exhibitions such as Staatsgalerie Stuttgart and the Wilhelm-Hack-Museum in Ludwigshafen. Schidlowsky worked as a professor of composition both in Chile and Israel, influencing many students.

Life and career 
León Schidlowsky was born in Santiago de Chile on 21 July 1931. He studied there at the Instituto Nacional from 1940 to 1947, and the piano with Roberto Duncker at the Conservatorio Nacional of the Universidad de Chile from 1942 to 1948, completing with a diploma. He completed his studies in Germany at the Nordwestdeutsche Musikakademie (later Hochschule für Musik Detmold) in Detmold. He met his future wife there, Susanne they married in 1953.

Chile (1954–1968) 
After his return to Chile in 1954, Schidlowsky became a member of the avant-garde ensemble Grupo Tonus in Santiago and served as its director from 1958 to 1961. This ensemble wanted to spread avant-garde and contemporary music in Chile. In 1956 Schidlowsky produced Nacimiento, considered the first electroacoustic work composed in Latin America. Between 1956 and 1959 he was member of the British Council and between 1956 and 1961 a musical adviser of the pantomime ensemble Grupo Noisvander. He served as director of the music library at the Instituto de Extensión Musical in 1961 and 1962, and as secretary-general of the Asociación Nacional de Compositores from 1961 to 1963. He also served as director-general of the Instituto de Extensión Musical, of the university from 1962 to 1966. In this period the Institute achieved distinction, with the performance of music that had never been played in Chile before, and with the performance of at least one work by a Chilean composer every year. Besides that, a number of orchestral conductors, soloists, and foreign orchestras visited Chile and made a substantial contribution to the musical culture of the country.

In 1964, Schidlowsky was, together with Luigi Dallapiccola and Alberto Ginastera, a member of the jury in a composers' competition in Buenos Aires, Argentina. The same year he took part in the music symposium Latin America and the music of our time (América Latina y la música de nuestros tiempos) in Lima, Peru. In 1965, Schidlowsky was appointed Professor of Composition at the Conservatorio Nacional, serving until 1968. In 1966 he participated in the Inter-American Festival in Washington, D.C., U.S., as well as the Festival Interamericano de Música in Caracas, Venezuela. In 1967, he took part in the Festival of Music from Spain and Latin America, in Madrid, Spain. He participated in the Festival of the Three Worlds in Mérida, Venezuela, in 1968, with lectures and discussions with the composers Krzyztof Penderecki and Luigi Nono. The city of Mérida nominated him a Distinguished Guest of the City. In the same year he received a Fellowship from the John Simon Guggenheim Memorial Foundation in order to write an opera, which he completed in Germany.

Israel 
In 1969, Schidlowsky was appointed Professor for Composition and Music Theory at the Samuel Rubin Academy of Music at the Tel Aviv University.  In 1979 he was granted a sabbatical year, which he spent in Hamburg. He has given many conferences in Berlin, Hamburg, Stuttgart, Vienna, Lund, and Saragossa. Schidlowsky received several fellowships from the German Academic Exchange Service (DAAD), and stayed in Berlin twice for an extended period, where he composed and painted. During one of these sojourns, in 1999, his wife Susanne died; she was buried in Tel Aviv. He served at the university until 2000. Schidlowsky gave courses in composition in several countries; and he has helped to form and influence a whole generation of composers in Israel, including Avraham Amzallag, Chaya Arbel, Mary Even-Or, Rachel Galinne, Betty Olivero, Jan Radzynski, Ruben Seroussi, Ron Weidberg, Moshe Zorman.

Personal life 
Schidlowsky's wife, Susanne Schidlowsky, died in 1999. They had five children (David, Elias, Judith, and twins Yuval and Noam).

Schidlowsky died in Tel Aviv on 10 October 2022, at the age of 91.

Awards 
Schidlowsky received various awards for his music, such as at the Festivales de Música Chilena, with works of his being awarded the Chilean Prize CRAV. In 1996 he received the First Prize for his work Absalom in the 60th anniversary competition of the Israel Philharmonic Orchestra.

In 2000 he was awarded the ACUM Prize for his entire oeuvre by the Israel Composers Association. He received the Engel Prize for his original work and his research into Jewish music, awarded by the city of Tel Aviv in June 2007. On 21 August 2014, Schidlowsky was awarded the Chilean National Prize for Musical Arts, accompanied  by several homages, press articles and interviews in the local press.

Works 
Many of Schidlowsky's works make reference to his Jewish-Israeli identity and to the history of the Jewish people, as well as to his interest in history and the political and social situation in Chile and Latin America. There is also in his works a musical response to his personal life and experience, such as the death of his wife Susanne (1999) and his son Elias (2004), or the destiny of many personal and professional friends, or personalities of his time. As an admirer of Arnold Schoenberg´s music, Schidlowsky began his career as a composer in the tradition of the Second Viennese School. His music is also highly influenced by Edgard Varèse, specially on his concern with timbre and freedom of form.

Later he began to use serial techniques, and to experiment with various tonal concepts (atonal, aleatoric, graphic notation), but always on the understanding that music has a deeper significance which transcends absolute art, which can open up a path for a human being to find a way to himself (Schidlowsky: "Art itself has not only one meaning. It includes and encompasses all senses, questions and all answers. I think that art is a way to us.").

The scores of his graphic music have been shown in various exhibitions linked to concerts, such as in the Staatsgalerie Stuttgart, Kunsthaus Hamburg, the Wilhelm-Hack-Museum, Ludwigshafen, and the Stadtgalerie Saarbrücken.

Schidlowsky's works include:
	 
 Caupolicán, text by Pablo Neruda, for speaker, mixed chorus, 2 pianos, 6 percussionists
 Tríptico for orchestra
 Kristallnacht, text: fragment from a traditional Jewish prayer, for tenor, male chorus, orchestra
 Invocation, text by the composer, for soprano, speaker, orchestra
 Llaqui, text by Javier Heraud, for speaker and orchestra]
 New York for orchestra
 Epitafio para Hermann Scherchen for orchestra
 Amereida
 Llaqui, text by Javier Heraud, for speaker and orchestra
 Memento, text by Heraud, for soprano and orchestra
 Ecce Homo, text after fragments of Che Guevara), for soprano and orchestra, 1969
 In Eius Memoriam, for orchestra
 Amerindia
 Preludio for orchestra
 Los heraldos negros, text by César Vallejo), for speaker and orchestra
 Sacsahuamán, for orchestra
 Era el crepúsculo de la iguana, text by Pablo Neruda, for speaker and orchestra
 Yo vengo a hablar, text by Neruda, for speaker and orchestra
 Missa in Nomine Bach, text from the Mass, for mixed chorus and ensemble (8 players)
 Nacht, text by the composer, for mixed chorus
 Lux in Tenebris,  for orchestra
 In memoriam Luigi Nono, for viola, cello and double bass
 Arabesque for transverse flute
 Silvestre Revueltas, text by Neruda, for speaker and chamber ensemble
 Prelude to a Drama, for orchestra
 Absalom, for orchestra
 Three Dialogues for 2 violins
 In memoriam Jorge Peña, text by the composer, for speaker and orchestra
 And death shall have no dominion for orchestra
 Job for orchestra
 L´inferno for orchestra
 Partita for cello
 In memoriam György Ligeti for orchestra
 Nocturno, text by Neruda, for narrator and orchestra
 Soledad, text in Quechua and Spanish, for voice, oboe, horn and cello
 Lautaro, text by Neruda, for narrator and orchestra
 Valparaíso, text by Álvaro Gallegos, narrator and orchestra

Examples from his graphic notation music include:

 Kolot for harp
 Trigon for violin or viola, cello and piano
 Actions for Piano'''
 Vera la morte, text by Cesare Pavese, for voice and percussion
 Hommage to Picasso, text by Gertrude Stein, for voice
 Tetralog Music for Piano and Winds Music for Piano and Strings Music for Piano and Percussion Music for Piano and Voice Dadayamasong, text by Franz Mehring, for soprano, saxophone, piano and percussion
 Misa Sine Nomine (In Memoriam Víctor Jara) Bereschít bará elohím et haschamáim weét haáretz text from the Bible, for two mixed choruses and percussion
 Kyrie eleison for large mixed chorus
 Lied, text by George Grosz, for speaker and organ
 Gloria, for large mixed chorus and four gongs (1 player)
 Chile, text by the composer, for 20 mixed voices
 Credo, for speaker, large mixed chorus, organ and four bass drums (1 player)
 Benedictus, for 36 mixed voices and four suspended cymbals (1 player)
 Ich komme, text by Vladimir Mayakovsky, for 36 mixed voices
 Dona nobis pacem, for large mixed chorus
 Babel, text from the Bible, for 6 sopranos, 6 altos, 4 tenors, 4 basses
 Epilog, text from the Bible, for speaker, small mixed chorus, large mixed chorus, organ, 4 percussion
 Palindrom for women's chorus
 Am Grab Kafkas, text by Franz Kafka), for women's voice (+ crotales)
 Greise sind die Sterne geworden, texts by Heinrich Heine, Georg Trakl, Else Lasker-Schüler, Mascha Kaléko, Erich Fried, Novalis, and the Bible, for soprano, alto, baritone, speaker, mixed chorus, piano, organ, harpsichord, celesta, 3 percussion
 Deutschland ein Wintermärchen, for chorus, speaker, soloist, piano, and percussion ensemble

Among his numerous works, Schidlowsky also wrote three operas:

 Die Menschen, opera in four acts, libretto by the composer, after Walter Hasenclever
 Der Dybbuk, opera in three acts, libretto by the composer, after S. Ansky
 Before Breakfast, opera in one act, libretto by the composer, after Eugene O'Neill

 References 

 Bibliography 
 Fugellie Videla, Daniela: "La música gráfica de León Schidlowsky: Deutschland ein Wintermärchen (1979) como partitura multimedial". In: Revista Musical Chilena. Año LXVI, Número 218, Santiago de Chile, July to December 2012.
 David Schidlowsky (ed.): "Gráfica musical. León Schidlowsky". RiL editores Santiago de Chile 2012 - .
 David Schidlowsky [ed.): "musikalische Grafik - graphic music. León Schidlowsky". Wissenschaftlicher Verlag Berlin, Berlin 2011 - .
 Rüdiger, Wolfgang: "Was wollen wir bauen? Leon Schidlowsky: 'Am Grab Kafkas' für Stimmen und Crotales". In: Stoll, Rolf (ed.): Teamwork! Sprache, Bild, Bewegung, Szene: neue Musik für Schülerensemble. Musik und Bildung Spezial. Praxis Unterricht. Schott Verlag, Mainz 2004.
 Fresis, Errico: "Zwischen Berger und Meer. Der Komponist Leon Schidlowsky". In: Neue Musikzeitung, H. 9, Regensburg 2001.
 Traber, Habakuk: "Schidlowsky, Leon: misa sine nomine". In: Forum Kirchenmusik, 3, Templin, Germany 1999.
 Kube, Michael: "Schidlowsky, Leon: misa sine nomine". In: Neue Zeitschrift für Musik, 3, Mainz 1999.
 Lutzky, Z.: "Leon Schidlowsky: Portrait of a Composer as a Rebel". In: Israel Music Institute News, 91/3, Tel Aviv 1991.
 Cohen, Y. W.: "Neimej smiroth Israel".  Tel Aviv 1990, 236-243.
 Maur, Karin von: "Thema Musik – Malerei – Musikalische Graphic". In: Katalog zur Ausstellung Leon Schidlowsky Musikalische Graphik. Staatsgalerie Stuttgart 1979.
 Karkoschka, Erhard: "Zu musikalische Graphik und Leon Schidlowsky's einschlägigen Arbeiten". In: Katalog zur Ausstellung Leon Schidlowsky Musikalische Graphik. Staatsgalerie Stuttgar 1979.
 Leon Schidlowsky Musikalische Graphic,. exhibition catalogue, Staatsgalerie Stuttgart 1979
 Karkoschka, Erhard: "Leon Schidlowsky's "DADAYAmasONG". Eine musikalische Graphik und ihre Interpretation". In: Göllner, Theodor (ed.): Notenschrift und Aufführung. Symposium zur Jahrestagung der Gesellschaft für Musikforschung 1977 in Munich. Tutzing (Hans SchneiderVerlag), 1980. Part of a series: Münchner Veröffentlichungen zur Musikgeschichte vol. 30
   Grebe, María Ester: "León Schidlowsky Gaete. Síntesis de su trayectoria creativa (1952-1968)". In: Revista Musical Chilena 22, H. 104/105, 7-52, Santiago de Chile 1968.
 Compositores de América/Composers of the Americas, Editor: The Pan American Union, Vol. 10, Washington DC 1965.

 Recordings 
 Obras sinfónicas. Compositores chilenos Vol. 4. Academia Chilena de Bellas Artes. Santiago de Chile 2013. CD 7126709014223
 Leon Schidlowsky zum 75. Geburtstag.
 Greise sind die Sterne geworden. Eine moderne Passion, live recording of the world premiere on 25 March 2000". musikart Ingo Schulz, CD 4012831190634
 Misa sine nomine'', live concert on 12 September 1998. CD 4012831190436

External links 
 
 Leon Schidlowsky Schott Music
 Leon Schidlowsky (in German) Emmaus
 
 
 Labor cumplida en 1957 por el Instituto de extension musical de la Universidad de Chile obtienearchivo.bcn.cl

1931 births
2022 deaths
Israeli composers
Chilean composers
Chilean male composers
Notation
20th-century classical composers
21st-century classical composers
Jewish classical composers
Chilean emigrants to Israel
Chilean Jews
Chilean people of Polish-Jewish descent
Chilean people of Russian-Jewish descent
Israeli Jews
Hochschule für Musik Detmold alumni
Male classical composers
Twelve-tone and serial composers
20th-century male musicians
21st-century male musicians
University of Chile alumni
Instituto Nacional General José Miguel Carrera alumni